Herbert Clark may refer to:

Herbert E. Clark, Maine state legislator
Herbert H. Clark, psycholinguist
Herbert V. Clark, U.S. Army Air Corps/U.S. Air Force officer, member of the Tuskegee Airmen
Herbert Clark (footballer), English footballer
Herbert Clark (cricketer), see Walter Scott (American cricketer)
Herb Clark Jr. in New Hampshire primary
Herbert Clark (war correspondent), see New York Herald Tribune
Herbert Clark, see Mount Marshall (New York)

See also
Bert Clark (disambiguation)
Herbert Clarke (disambiguation)